John Arthur Call (born July 30, 1935) is a former American football halfback who played for the Baltimore Colts and Pittsburgh Steelers. He played college football at Colgate University, having previously attended Cortland High School.

References

1935 births
Living people
People from Cortland, New York
Players of American football from New York (state)
American football halfbacks
Colgate Raiders football players
Baltimore Colts players
Pittsburgh Steelers players